Justice Tyler may refer to:

James Manning Tyler, associate justice of the Vermont Supreme Court
John Tyler Sr., associate justice of the first Virginia Court of Appeals
Royall Tyler, associate justice of the Vermont Supreme Court

See also
Judge Tyler (disambiguation)